The Greyhound was a public house (popularly known as "The Spotted Dog"), in High Street, Old Portsmouth, England. It is famous as the site of the murder of George Villiers, 1st Duke of Buckingham in 1628. It is now a hotel.

Architecture and conservation
The building is timber-framed, but this is not evident from outside as it has been refronted. It became a private building called Buckingham House and was listed under that name in 1953.

In letters
The murder site was toured by the famous diarist and Royal Navy administrator Samuel Pepys in 1662. Pepys was accompanied by his wife Elisabeth, along with his Republican clerk Tom Hayter and wife, and the Earl of Sandwich's Puritan secretary John Creed (Pepys' Diary, 3 June).

Present
The building bears a commemorative plaque to mark the assassination.
It is now a hotel.

Notes and references

History of the Royal Navy
Buildings and structures in Portsmouth
Grade II* listed buildings in Hampshire
Pubs in Hampshire
Timber framed buildings in Hampshire
Former pubs in England